Canterbury is a cathedral city and UNESCO World Heritage Site, situated in the heart of the City of Canterbury local government district of Kent, England. It lies on the River Stour.

The Archbishop of Canterbury is the primate of the Church of England and the worldwide Anglican Communion owing to the importance of St Augustine, who served as the apostle to the pagan Kingdom of Kent around the turn of the 7th century. The city's cathedral became a major focus of pilgrimage following the 1170 martyrdom of Thomas Becket, although it had already been a well-trodden pilgrim destination since the murder of St Alphege by the men of King Canute in 1012. A journey of pilgrims to Becket's shrine served as the frame for Geoffrey Chaucer's 14th-century classic The Canterbury Tales.

Canterbury is a popular tourist destination: consistently one of the most-visited cities in the United Kingdom, the city's economy is heavily reliant upon tourism. The city has been occupied since Paleolithic times and served as the capital of the Celtic Cantiaci and Jute Kingdom of Kent. Many historical structures fill the area, including a city wall founded in Roman times and rebuilt in the 14th century, the ruins of St Augustine's Abbey,  the Norman Canterbury Castle, and the oldest extant school in the world, the King's School. Modern additions include the Marlowe Theatre and Kent County Cricket Club's St Lawrence Ground.

Canterbury has a substantial student population and one of the highest proportions of students to permanent residents in the country. Nevertheless, it remains relatively small when compared with other British cities.

History

Name 
The Roman settlement of Durovernum Cantiacorum ("Kentish Durovernum") occupied the location of an earlier British town whose ancient British name has been reconstructed as *Durou̯ernon ("stronghold by the alder grove"), although the name is sometimes supposed to have derived from various British names for the Stour. (Medieval variants of the Roman name include Dorobernia and Dorovernia.) In Sub-Roman Britain, it was known in Old Welsh as Cair Ceint ("stronghold of Kent"). Occupied by the Jutes, it became known in Old English as Cantwareburh ("stronghold of the Kentish men"), which developed into the present name.

Early history 

The Canterbury area has been inhabited since prehistoric times. Lower Paleolithic axes, and Neolithic and Bronze Age pots have been found in the area. Canterbury was first recorded as the main settlement of the Celtic tribe of the Cantiaci, which inhabited most of modern-day Kent. In the 1st century AD, the Romans captured the settlement and named it Durovernum Cantiacorum. The Romans rebuilt the city, with new streets in a grid pattern, a theatre, a temple, a forum, and public baths. Although they did not maintain a major military garrison, its position on Watling Street relative to the major Kentish ports of Rutupiae (Richborough), Dubrae (Dover), and Lemanae (Lymne) gave it considerable strategic importance.

Despite being counted as one of the 28 cities of Sub-Roman Britain, it seems that after the Romans left Britain in 410 Durovernum Cantiacorum was abandoned for around 100 years, except by a few farmers and gradually decayed. Over the next 100 years, an Anglo-Saxon community formed within the city walls, as Jutish refugees arrived, possibly intermarrying with the locals. In 597, Pope Gregory the Great sent Augustine to convert its King Æthelberht to Christianity. After the conversion, Canterbury, being a Roman town, was chosen by Augustine as the centre for his episcopal see in Kent, and an abbey and cathedral were built. Augustine thus became the first Archbishop of Canterbury. The town's new importance led to its revival, and trades developed in pottery, textiles, and leather. By 630, gold coins were being struck at the Canterbury mint. In 672, the Synod of Hertford gave the see of Canterbury authority over the entire English Church.

In 842 and 851, Canterbury suffered great loss of life during Danish raids. In 978, Archbishop Dunstan refounded the abbey built by Augustine, and named it St Augustine's Abbey. The siege of Canterbury saw a large Viking army besiege Canterbury in 1011, culminating in the city being pillaged and the eventual murder of Archbishop Alphege on 19 April 1012. Remembering the destruction caused by the Danes, the inhabitants of Canterbury did not resist William the Conqueror's invasion in 1066. William immediately ordered a wooden motte-and-bailey castle to be built by the Roman city wall. In the early 12th century, the castle was rebuilt with stone.

After the murder of the Archbishop Thomas Becket at the cathedral in 1170, Canterbury became one of the most notable towns in Europe, as pilgrims from all parts of Christendom came to visit his shrine. This pilgrimage provided the framework for Geoffrey Chaucer's 14th-century collection of stories, The Canterbury Tales. Canterbury Castle was captured by the French Prince Louis during his 1215 invasion of England, before the death of John caused his English supporters to desert his cause and support the young Henry III.

Canterbury is associated with several saints from this period who lived in Canterbury:
 Saint Augustine of Canterbury
 Saint Anselm of Canterbury
 Saint Thomas Becket
 Saint Mellitus
 Saint Theodore of Tarsus
 Saint Dunstan
 Saint Adrian of Canterbury
 Saint Alphege
 Saint Æthelberht of Kent

14th–17th centuries 

Black Death reached Canterbury in 1348. At 10,000, Canterbury had the 10th largest population in England; by the early 16th century, the population had fallen to 3,000. In 1363, during the Hundred Years' War, a Commission of Inquiry found disrepair, stone-robbing and ditch-filling had led to the Roman wall becoming eroded. Between 1378 and 1402, the wall was virtually rebuilt, and new wall towers were added. In 1381, during Wat Tyler's Peasants' Revolt, the castle and Archbishop's Palace were sacked, and Archbishop Sudbury was beheaded in London. Sudbury is still remembered annually by the Christmas mayoral procession to his tomb at Canterbury Cathedral. In 1413 Henry IV became the only sovereign to be buried at the cathedral. In 1448 Canterbury was granted a City Charter, which gave it a mayor and a high sheriff; the city still has a Lord Mayor and Sheriff. In 1504 the cathedral's main tower, the Bell Harry Tower, was completed, ending 400 years of building.

Cardinal Wolsey visited in June 1518 and was given a present of fruit, nuts, and marchpane. In 1519 a public cage for talkative women and other wrongdoers was set up next to the town's pillory at the Bullstake, now the Buttermarket. In 1522 a stone cross with gilt lead stars was erected at the same place, and painted with bice and gilded by Florence the painter. During the Dissolution of the Monasteries, the city's priory, nunnery and three friaries were closed. St Augustine's Abbey, the 14th richest in England at the time, was surrendered to the Crown, and its church and cloister were levelled. The rest of the abbey was dismantled over the next 15 years, although part of the site was converted to a palace. Thomas Becket's shrine in the cathedral was demolished and all the gold, silver and jewels were removed to the Tower of London, and Becket's images, name and feasts were obliterated throughout the kingdom, ending the pilgrimages.

By the 17th century, Canterbury's population was 5,000; of whom 2,000 were French-speaking Protestant Huguenots, who had begun fleeing persecution and war in the Spanish Netherlands in the mid-16th century. The Huguenots introduced silk weaving into the city, which by 1676 had outstripped wool weaving.

In 1620, Robert Cushman negotiated the lease of the Mayflower at 59 Palace Street for the purpose of transporting the Pilgrims to America. Charles I and Henrietta Maria visited in 1625 and musicians played whilst the couple entered the town under a velvet canopy held by six men holding poles.

In 1647, during the English Civil War, riots broke out when Canterbury's puritan mayor banned church services on Christmas Day. The riots became known as the "Plum Pudding Riots". The rioters' trial the following year led to a Kent revolt against Parliamentarian forces, contributing to the start of the second phase of the war. However, Canterbury surrendered peacefully to Parliamentarians at the Battle of Maidstone.

18th century–present 

By 1770, the castle had fallen into disrepair, and many parts of it were demolished during the late 18th century and early 19th century.  In 1787 all the gates in the city wall, except for Westgate—the city jail—were demolished as a result of a commission that found them impeding to new coach travel. Canterbury Prison opened in 1808 just outside the city boundary. By 1820 the silk weaving in the city had been supplanted by imported Indian muslins and trade carried  out was thereafter largely of hops and wheat. The Canterbury & Whitstable Railway (The Crab and Winkle Way), the world's first passenger railway, was opened in 1830; bankrupt by 1844, it was purchased by the South Eastern Railway, which connected the town to its larger network in 1846. The London, Chatham & Dover Railway arrived in 1860; the competition and cost-cutting between the lines was resolved by merging them as the South Eastern & Chatham in 1899. In 1848, St Augustine's Abbey was refurbished for use as a missionary college for the Church of England's representatives in the British colonies. Between 1830 and 1900, the city's population grew from 15,000 to 24,000.

During the First World War, a number of barracks and voluntary hospitals were set up around the city, and in 1917 a German bomber crash-landed near Broad Oak Road.

During the Second World War, 10,445 bombs dropped during 135 separate raids destroyed 731 homes and 296 other buildings in the city, including the missionary college and Simon Langton Girls' Grammar Schools. 119 civilian people died through enemy action in the borough. The most devastating raid was on 1 June 1942 during the Baedeker Blitz. On that day alone, 43 people were killed and nearly 100 sustained wounds. Some 800 buildings were destroyed with 1,000 seriously damaged. Although its library was destroyed, the cathedral did not sustain extensive bomb damage and the local Fire Wardens doused any flames on the wooden roof. On 31 October 1942, the Luftwaffe made a further raid on Canterbury when thirty Focke-Wulf fighter-bombers, supported by sixty fighter escorts, launched a low-level raid on Canterbury. Civilians were strafed and bombed throughout the city resulting in twenty-eight bombs dropped and 30 people killed. Three German planes were shot down by the Royal Air Force.

Before the end of the war, architect Charles Holden drew up plans to redevelop the city centre, but locals were so opposed that the Citizens' Defence Association was formed and swept to power in the 1945 municipal elections. Rebuilding of the city centre eventually began 10 years after the war. A ring road was constructed in stages outside the city walls some time afterwards to alleviate growing traffic problems in the city centre, which was later pedestrianised. The biggest expansion of the city occurred in the 1960s, with the arrival of the University of Kent at Canterbury and Christ Church College.

The 1980s saw visits from Pope John Paul II and Queen Elizabeth II, and the beginning of the annual Canterbury Festival. Between 1999 and 2005, the Whitefriars Shopping Centre underwent major redevelopment. In 2000, during the redevelopment, a major archaeological project was undertaken by the Canterbury Archaeological Trust, known as the Big Dig, which was supported by Channel Four's Time Team.

Mahatma Gandhi visited Canterbury
in October 1931 and met stalinist Hewlett Johnson, then Dean of Canterbury.

The extensive restoration of the cathedral that was underway in mid 2018 was part of a 2016-2021 schedule that includes replacement of the nave roof, improved landscaping and accessibility, new visitor facilities and a general external restoration. The so-called Canterbury Journey project was expected to cost nearly £25 million.

Governance 
The Member of Parliament for the Canterbury constituency, which includes Whitstable, is Rosie Duffield of the Labour Party.

The city became a county corporate in 1461, and later a county borough under the Local Government Act 1888. In 1974 it lost its status as the smallest county borough in England, after the Local Government Act 1972, and came under the control of Kent County Council. Canterbury, along with Whitstable and Herne Bay, is now in the City of Canterbury local government district. The city's urban area consists of the six electoral wards of Barton, Blean Forest, Northgate, St Stephens, Westgate, and Wincheap. These wards have eleven of the fifty seats on the Canterbury City Council. Six of these seats are held by the Liberal Democrats, four by the Conservatives and one by Labour. Canterbury City Council's meeting place is the former Church of the Holy Cross. After it was declared redundant and de-consecrated in 1972, it was acquired by the city council and converted for municipal use: it was officially re-opened by the Prince of Wales as the new Canterbury Guildhall and meeting place of the city council on 9 November 1978.

Geography 

Nearby villages include Chartham, Rough Common, Sturry and Tyler Hill. The civil parish of Thanington Without is to the southwest; the rest of the city is unparished. St Dunstan's, St Stephen's, Longport, Stuppington, Wincheap and Hales Place are suburbs of the city.

The city is on the River Stour or Great Stour, flowing from its source at Lenham north-east through Ashford to the English Channel at Sandwich. As it flows north-east, the river divides west of the city, one branch flowing through the city centre, and the other around the position of the former walls. The two branches create several river islands before finally recombining around the town of Fordwich on the edge of the marshland north east of the city. The Stour is navigable on the tidal section to Fordwich, although above this point canoes and other small craft can be used. Punts and rowed river boats are available for hire in Canterbury.
The geology of the area consists mainly of brickearth overlying chalk. Tertiary sands overlain by London clay form St. Thomas's Hill and St. Stephen's Hill about a mile northwest of the city centre.

Demography 

At the 2001 UK census, the total population of the city itself was 43,432, and 135,278 within the Canterbury district. In 2011, the total district population was counted as 151,200, with an 11.7% increase from 2001.

By 2011, the population of the city had grown to over 55,000.

In both cases, the city concentrates about one third of the district population.

By 2001, residents of the city had an average age of 37.1 years, younger than the 40.2 average of the district and the 38.6 average for England. Of the 17,536 households, 35% were one-person households, 39% were couples, 10% were lone parents, and 15% other. Of those aged 16–74 in the city, 27% had a higher education qualification, higher than the 20% national average.

Compared with the rest of England, the city had an above-average proportion of foreign-born residents, at around 12%. Ninety-five percent of residents were recorded as white; the largest minority group was recorded as Asian, at 1.8% of the population. Religion was recorded as 68.2% Christian, 1.1% Muslim, 0.5% Buddhist, 0.8% Hindu, 0.2% Jewish, and 0.1% Sikh. The rest either had no religion, an alternative religion, or did not state their religion.

Economy 

Canterbury district retained approximately 4,761 businesses, up to 60,000 full and part-time employees and was worth £1.3 billion in 2001. This made the district the second largest economy in Kent. Today, the three primary sectors are tourism, higher education and retail.

In 2015, the value of tourism to the city of Canterbury was over £450 million; 7.2 million people visited that year. A full 9,378 jobs were supported by tourism, an increase of 6% over the previous year. The two universities provided an even greater benefit. In 2014/2015, the University of Kent and Canterbury Christ Church University were worth £909m to city's economy and accounted for 16% of all jobs.

Unemployment in the city has dropped significantly since 2001 owing to the opening of the Whitefriars shopping complex which introduced thousands of job opportunities. The city's economy benefits mainly from significant economic projects such as the Canterbury Enterprise Hub, Lakesview International Business Park and the Whitefriars retail development.

The registered unemployment rate as of September 2011 stood at 5.7%. By May 2018, the rate had dropped to 1.8%; in fact, Kent in general had a moderate unemployment rate of 2%. This data considers only people claiming either Jobseekers Allowance or Universal Credit principally for the reason of being unemployed. It does not include those without access to such benefits. At the time, the national rate was 4.2%.

Climate 
Canterbury experiences an oceanic climate (Köppen climate classification Cfb), similar to almost all of the United Kingdom. Canterbury enjoys mild temperatures all year round, being between 1.8 °C (35.2 °F) and 22.8 °C (73 °F). There is relatively little rainfall throughout the year.

Culture

Landmarks 

Canterbury Cathedral is Mother Church of the Anglican Communion and seat of the Archbishop of Canterbury. Founded in 597 AD by Augustine, it forms a World Heritage Site, along with Saxon St. Martin's Church and the ruins of St Augustine's Abbey. The cathedral receives a million visitors annually and is one of the most visited places in the country. Services are held three or more times a day.

Canterbury Roman Museum houses an in situ mosaic pavement dating from around 300 AD. Other surviving Roman structures in the city include Queningate, a blocked gate in the city wall, and the Dane John Mound, once part of a Roman cemetery. The Dane John Gardens were built beside the mound in the 18th century, and a memorial placed on the mound's summit. There was a windmill on the mound between 1731 and 1839.

Westgate is a museum narrating its earlier use as a jail. The medieval church of St Alphege became redundant in 1982 and following a period as the Canterbury Urban Studies Centre, later the Canterbury Environment Centre, is used  by the King's School. The Old Synagogue, now the King's School Music Room, is one of only two Egyptian Revival synagogues still standing. The city centre contains many timber-framed 16th and 17th century houses but others were destroyed, particularly in the Second World War Baedeker Blitz. Survivors include the Huguenot "Old Weaver's House". St Martin's Mill is the only surviving mill out of the six known to have stood in Canterbury. It was built in 1817 and worked until 1890 but is now a residence. St Thomas of Canterbury Church is the only Roman Catholic church in the city and contains relics of Thomas Becket.

The 17th century, double jettied, half-timbered Crooked House bookshop operated by the Catching Lives homelessness charity at the end of Palace Street, opposite Kings School is frequently photographed for its quirky, slanted appearance.

The closed Canterbury Heritage Museum housed many exhibits, including a Rupert Bear Museum.

Canterbury Castle's Norman ruins.

Herne Bay Times reported in 2011 that the Heritage at Risk Register included 19 listed buildings in Canterbury which needed urgent repair, for which Canterbury City Council had insufficient funds.

Theatre

Marlowe Theatre

The Marlowe Theatre is named after Christopher Marlowe, who was born in the city.  It was formerly located in St Margaret's Street but moved to the present location in 1984.

The Theatre was completely rebuilt in 2011 with a main 1,200 seat auditorium and secondary performance space. It's modern structure is a landmark across the city.

Other theatres

The University of Kent's Gulbenkian Theatre serves the city, and incorporates a cinema and café.

Theatrical performances take place at Canterbury Cathedral and St Augustine's Abbey.

, the oldest surviving theatre building in Canterbury is The Shakespeare bar which had been a playhouse in the Tudor period.

Theatre companies

Theatre companies in Canterbury, include the University of Kent Students' Union's T24 Drama Society; The Canterbury Players, and Kent Youth Theatre.

Music

In common with many English towns and cities in the Middle Ages, Canterbury employed a band of waits. There are records of payments to the waits from 1402, though they probably existed earlier. The waits were disbanded by the city authorities in 1641 for 'misdemeanors' but reinstated in 1660 when they played for the visit of King Charles II on his return from exile. Civic waits were ultimately abolished nationally by the Municipal Corporations Act of 1835 but a modern, early music group called The Canterbury Waits has revived the name.

Canterbury's Catch Club was a musical and social club which met in the city between 1779 and 1865. Its male club members met weekly in the winter and employed an orchestra to assist in performances for the first half of their evening. After an interval, the members sang catches and glees from the club's extensive music library which is now deposited at Canterbury Cathedral's archives.

In the late 1960s and early 1970s the Canterbury Scene emerged comprising progressive rock, avant-garde and jazz musicians established within the city. Members included Soft Machine, Caravan, Matching Mole, Egg, Hatfield and the North, National Health, Gilgamesh, Soft Heap, Khan and In Cahoots.

Major touring bands have played at the University of Kent and Marlowe Theatre / Canterbury Odeon.

Ian Dury, front man of 1970s rock band Ian Dury and the Blockheads, taught Fine Art at Canterbury College of Art and early incarnations of his band Kilburn and the High Roads performed in the city.

Canterbury Choral Society give regular concerts in Canterbury Cathedral, typically large-scale classical choral works.

The Canterbury Orchestra, founded in 1953, continue to tackle major works from the symphonic repertoire with enthusiasm.

Other local musical groups include the Canterbury Singers, also founded in 1953; Cantemus, and the City of Canterbury Chamber Choir.

Canterbury Festival takes place over two weeks in October including musical events ranging from opera and symphony concerts to world music, jazz and folk. From 2006 to 2015 the July Lounge On The Farm music festival presented rock, indie and dance artists near Canterbury.

Composers
Composers with a Canterbury association include:-
 Thomas Tallis (–1585), became a lay clerk (singing man) at Canterbury Cathedral  and was subsequently appointed a Gentleman of the Chapel Royal in 1543.
 John Ward (1571–1638), born in Canterbury, a chorister at Canterbury Cathedral, composed madrigals, works for viol consort, services, and anthems.
 Orlando Gibbons (1583–1625), organist, composer and Gentleman of the Chapel Royal, who died in Canterbury and was buried in the cathedral.
 William Flackton (1709–1798), born in Canterbury, a chorister at Canterbury Cathedral, was an organist, viola player and composer.
 John Marsh (1752–1828), lawyer, amateur composer and concert organiser, wrote two symphonies for the Canterbury Orchestra before moving to Chichester in 1784.
 Thomas Clark (1775–1859), shoemaker and organist at the Methodist church in Canterbury, composer of 'West Gallery' hymns and psalm tunes.
 Sir George Job Elvey (1816–1893), organist and composer, was born in Canterbury and trained as a chorister at the cathedral.
 Alan Ridout (1934–1996) educator and broadcaster, composer of church, orchestral and chamber music.
 Sir Peter Maxwell Davies (1934-2016) was appointed an Honorary Fellow of Canterbury Christ Church University at a ceremony in Canterbury Cathedral.
 Many Canterbury Cathedral organists composed services, anthems, hymns, etc.

Sport 

St Lawrence Ground is notable as one of only two grounds used regularly for first-class cricket that have had a tree within the boundary, the other being the City Oval in Pietermaritzburg. It is the home ground of Kent County Cricket Club and has hosted several One Day Internationals, including an England match during the 1999 Cricket World Cup.

Canterbury City F.C. reformed in 2007 as a community interest company and currently compete in the Southern Counties East Football League. The previous incarnation of the club folded in 2001. Canterbury RFC were founded in 1926 and became the first East Kent club to achieve National League status and currently play in the fourth tier, National League 2 South.

The Tour de France passed through the city in 1994, and in 2007 it hosted the finish for Stage 1.

Canterbury Hockey Club is one of the largest in the country and enters teams in both the Men's and Women's England Hockey Leagues.  Former Olympic gold medal winner Sean Kerly has been a member.

Public sporting facilities are provided at Kingsmead Leisure Centre, including a  swimming pool and sports hall for football, basketball, and badminton.

Transport

Railway

The pioneering Canterbury & Whitstable Railway, known locally as the Crab and Winkle line, had a terminus at North Lane station. It ran from 3 May 1830 to 1953 and was the first regular passenger steam railway in the world.

Canterbury West railway station is operated by Southeastern and was opened to trains from Ashford and Ramsgate in 1846. , it is served by High Speed 1 trains to London St Pancras; slower stopping services to London Charing Cross, and London Victoria, as well as by trains to Ramsgate and Margate.

Canterbury East railway station, in the west of the city, was opened by the London, Chatham & Dover Railway in 1860. , services from London Victoria stop at Canterbury East and continue to Dover.

Because the two railways into the city were built by rival companies there is no direct interchange between Canterbury West and Canterbury East stations. Canterbury Parkway railway station has been proposed as an additional station outside of the city with links to both.

Canterbury South was on the Elham Valley Railway. The station opened in 1889 and closed, along with the rest of the railway, in 1947.

Road

An hourly National Express 007 coach service to and from Victoria Coach Station operates at Canterbury Central Bus Station. Eurolines offer services to London and Paris.

Stagecoach in East Kent run local bus routes in Canterbury as well as long-distance services. Its bio fuel 'Unibus' service operates between the city centre and University of Kent.

Cycling
National Cycle Routes 1 to Whitstable, and 18 to Chartham cross in the city.

Education 

, Canterbury hosts 31,000 students and has the highest student to permanent resident ratio in the UK. They attend three universities, and other higher education institutions.

University of Kent

, it enrolled around 20,000 students.

Other universities and colleges

Canterbury Christ Church University was founded as a teacher training college in 1962 by the Church of England. In 1978 its range of courses expanded; in 1995 it became a University college, and in 2005 a university. , it had around 15,000 students.

The University of Kent and Canterbury Christ Church University share some facilities.

The University for the Creative Arts was founded in 1882 by Thomas Sidney Cooper as his Sidney Cooper School of Art.

Girne American University

A Franciscan International Study Centre is located close to the University of Kent campus.

The independent Chaucer College provides courses to Japanese and other students from within the University of Kent campus.

Canterbury College, formerly Canterbury College of Technology, offers a mixture of vocational, further and higher education courses for school leavers and adults.

Primary and secondary schools 

St John's Church of England Primary School was founded as a Board School in 1876. The original neo-classical school building on Saint John's Place is now a private house, with the school housed in larger buildings at the end of the street.

King's School is the oldest secondary school in the United Kingdom. St. Augustine established it shortly after his 597 arrival in Canterbury though documented history of it only began after dissolution of the monasteries in the 16th century, when it took the present name in honour of Henry VIII.

Other independent secondary schools in Canterbury include Kent College and St Edmund's School.

The city's secondary grammar schools are Barton Court Grammar School, Simon Langton Grammar School for Boys and Simon Langton Girls' Grammar School, all of which in 2008 had over 93% of their pupils gain five or more GCSEs at grades A* to C including English and maths. The non-selective state secondary schools are The Canterbury High School, St Anselm's Catholic School and the Church of England Archbishop's School, all of which in 2008 had more than 30% of their pupils gain five or more GCSEs at grades A* to C including English and maths. In 2022, a new school was opened on Spring Lane, called Barton Manor School.

International boarding school CATS College, provides GCSE and A-Level courses.

Local media

Newspapers 
Canterbury's first newspaper was the Kentish Post, founded in 1717. It merged with newly founded Kentish Gazette in 1768 and is still being published, claiming to be the country's second oldest surviving newspaper. It is currently produced as a paid-for newspaper by KM Group in Whitstable with a 25,000 circulation across East Kent.

Three free weekly newspapers provide local news. The Daily Mail and General Trust's Canterbury Times has a circulation of 55,000. Similar circulation Canterbury Extra is owned by KM Group. yourcanterbury is published by KOS Media, which also prints Kent on Sunday.

Radio

Canterbury is served by local radio stations KMFM Canterbury on 106FM, and Community Student Radio CSR 97.4FM.

KMFM Canterbury was formerly KMFM106, and from foundation in 1997 until KM Group took control CTFM, a reference to Canterbury's CT postcode. KMFM's studio moved from the city to Ashford in 2008.

Studios at University of Kent, and Canterbury Christ Church University present CSR 97.4 which is transmitted from the University of Kent. It replaced C4 Radio and UKC Radio previously broadcast from those institutions.

Canterbury Hospital Radio serves Kent and Canterbury Hospital, and SBSLive's coverage is limited to the Simon Langton Boys School grounds.

Television

The city receives BBC One South East and ITV Meridian from transmitters at Dover and Chartham.

People 

People born in Canterbury include:

Composer Orlando Gibbons (1583–1625) died in Canterbury and is commemorated by a marble bust and memorial tablet in the cathedral.
The grave of author Joseph Conrad, in Canterbury Cemetery at 32 Clifton Gardens, is a Grade II listed building.

International relations 
Canterbury is twinned with the following cities:
Reims, France

City to city partnership
Esztergom, Hungary

Protocol d'accord
Saint-Omer, France, since 1995
Wimereux, France, since 1995
Certaldo, Italy, since 1997
Vladimir, Russia, since 1997: in 2022 the Canterbury twinning association condemned the 2022 Russian invasion of Ukraine but planned to maintain links with Vladimir.
Mölndal, Sweden, since 1997
Tournai, Belgium, since 1999
Bloomington, Illinois, United States

Freedom of the City

The following people and military units have received the Freedom of the City of Canterbury.

Individuals
 Henry Wace: 1921.
 Rt Hon Geoffrey Fisher : 26 February 1953.
 Rt Hon Lord Williams of Oystermouth : 17 November 2012.

Military Units
 5th Battalion The Royal Regiment of Scotland: 27 November 2008.

In popular culture

Russell Hoban repurposed Canterbury as "Cambry" in his 1980, post apocalyptic novel Riddley Walker. Wye became "How"; Dover, "Do It Over", and Ashford, "Bernt Arse".

References

External links 

 Canterbury City Council
 Canterbury Buildings website – Archaeological and heritage site of Canterbury's buildings.

 
Market towns in Kent
Coloniae (Roman)
Cities in South East England
Towns in Kent
Unparished areas in Kent
City of Canterbury